Dean Pooley (born 10 September 1986) is an English footballer who plays for Ebbsfleet United.

Career
Pooley was previously at Millwall, making one senior appearance for the club in a Championship game against Burnley in April 2006.

Sean Connor signed him for Bohemians where he did enough in pre-season games to be offered a contract. He made his league debut starting in centre midfield against Drogheda United in March 2007. He scored his first goal for Bohs in a League Cup game against Cork City on 3 July 2007. However, when his contract ended at the end of the 2007 season, Pooley was released by Bohs.

On 30 January 2007, manager Tommy Wright swooped to sign Pooley on a short-term deal until the end of the 2007–08 season. After a couple of appearances Pooley was released after the club and player mutually agreed to terminate the contract.

In August 2008, Pooley joined Conference National outfit, Ebbsfleet United on a one-year contract. This was extended by a further year following a fund raising appeal by Ebbsfleet manager Liam Daish to the owners of the club.

Dean was released by Ebbsfleet in May 2011.

On 13 June 2011, manager Chris Kinnear signed Pooley for Margate. He became Kinnear's first signing in his second spell in charge at the club.

On 13 August 2013, he signed for Conference South side Bromley. Pooley scored his first goal for the club in a 3–2 away win over Concord Rangers on 17 September 2013.

On 15 September 2014, he re-signed with Ebbsfleet United.

On 5 June 2015, Pooley departed the squad at Ebbsfleet United, but he will stay as an assistant to the general manager.

References

External links

1986 births
Living people
English footballers
Footballers from Sidcup
Association football defenders
Millwall F.C. players
Beckenham Town F.C. players
Bohemian F.C. players
Ballymena United F.C. players
Ebbsfleet United F.C. players
Margate F.C. players
Bromley F.C. players
English Football League players
League of Ireland players
NIFL Premiership players